"Rover" is a song recorded by South Korean singer Kai for his third extended play of the same name. It was released as the EP's lead single by SM Entertainment on March 13, 2023.

Background and release 
In February 2023, SM confirmed that Kai plans to release a new solo album. On February 17, SM announced that his new EP, Rover, would be released on March 13. The song was released alongside the extended play and its music video on March 13.

Composition 
"Rover" is a remake from Dara's original song titled "Mr. Rover"; it was composed by Cristian Tarcea, Dara, Valentina Nikova, YNGA, Gabriel Brandes and Young Chance, with the arrangement held by Tarcea and Imlay. It was described as a dancehall song featuring heavy bass, marimba, bells and various percussions. The lyrics, which was written by Park Tae-won, talks about of throwing off the restraints of others' viewpoints and living freely as a 'wanderer'. The song was composed in the key of C# minor, with a tempo of 186 beats per minute.

Music video 
The music video directed by Kim Ki-hyun, and Lee Hye-su of Swisher was released alongside the song by SM Entertainment on March 13. It was inspired by two movies: Billy Elliot (2000) and Catch Me If You Can (2002).

Release history

Credits 
Credits adapted from EP's liner notes.

Studio 
 SM Starlight Studio – recording, engineered for mix, digital editing
 SM Blue Ocean Studio – mixing
 821 Sound Mastering – mastering

Personnel 

 SM Entertainment – executive producer
 Lee Sung-soo – production director, executive supervisor
 Tak Young-jun – executive supervisor
 Yoo Young-jin – music and sound supervisor
 Kai – vocals
 Park Tae-won – lyrics
 Cristian Tarcea – composition, arrangement 
 Dara – composition 
 Valentina Nikova – composition 
 YNGA – composition 
 Young Chance – composition, vocal directing, background vocals 
 Gabriel Brandes – composition 
 Imlay – arrangement
 Jeong Yu-ra – recording, engineered for mix, digital editing
 Kim Cheol-sun – mixing
 Kwon Nam-woo – mastering

References 

2023 songs
2023 singles
Korean-language songs
SM Entertainment singles